Ziya Us Salam (born 1970) is an Indian author, literary critic, journalist and social commentator, who has worked for The Hindu Group since 2000. In addition to serving as the associate editor for magazine Frontline, he also wrote several columns on sociocultural issues and book reviews for the magazine.

Born in Rampur, his father was Islamic scholar Mufti Abdul Dayem Sahab (died 1983) while his mother is a housewife. Following his study at St. Stephen's College, he decided to work as a journalist in 1995. Since this, he has worked for several newspaper, including The Hindu, The Pioneer, The Statesman and The Times of India.

Biography
Salam was born in Rampur in 1970. His father, Mufti Abdul Dayem Sahab, an Islamic scholar, had written several scholarly works on Islamic sciences in Urdu and Arabic and also worked as a hadith translator, while his mother is a housewife. Salam has a sister, who works as a doctor. He and his family later moved to Delhi. He started his formal education at the Bluebells School International until the tenth grade and later at a convent school. Salam pursued his undergraduate study in History from St. Stephen's College. Following this, he started his career as a journalist in 1995. Recalling his childhood, he said: "When I was in grade V, I used to scribe the handwritten notes from different columns of the newspapers. After compilation, I used to distribute the Photostat copies of my notes among the friends in my colony at Lajpat nagar. I was in grade VII when first of my article was published."

Throughout his career, Salam has worked as a journalist for different newspapers. He has been working as a Features Editor for The Hindu's north India edition for more than 16 years and serves as an associate editor at the Frontline magazine. He published his first book on Islam, titled Till Talaq Do Us Part: Understanding Talaq, Triple Talaq and Khula, which discusses about marriage in the religion, on 12 April 2018. The Wire wrote, "This slim, lucid volume is a timely intervention which will hopefully succeed in its objective of clearing many misconceptions about the issue that has seen wide disjunction between the scriptures and practice." He published another book about it, Of Saffron Flags and Skullcaps: Hindutva, Muslim Identity and the Idea of India, on 21 May. With a foreword by Nirmala Lakshman (the director of The Hindu Group), the book discussed about discrimination against Muslims in India. Writing for Frontline, the Professor of Aligarh Muslim University Mohammad Sajjad observed of how Salam "rightly concludes his book on an optimistic note".

Bibliography

References

External links
 

1970 births
Living people
People from Rampur, Uttar Pradesh
Delhi University alumni
Indian editors
Indian film critics
Indian male journalists
The Hindu journalists
The Times of India journalists
People from Delhi
English-language writers from India
20th-century Indian Muslims